Carskadon House also known as the "Locust Grove" and "Radical Hill," is a historic home located near Burlington, Mineral County, West Virginia.  It was built in 1821, and is a two-story rectangular, side-gabled brick dwelling in a vernacular Federal style. It sits on a granite foundation and has a two-story rear ell.  It features a one-story, Greek Revival style entrance portico.  Also on the property are a contributing granary, scale house and barn.

It was listed on the National Register of Historic Places in 1987.

References

Houses on the National Register of Historic Places in West Virginia
Houses completed in 1821
1821 establishments in Virginia
Federal architecture in West Virginia
Houses in Mineral County, West Virginia
National Register of Historic Places in Mineral County, West Virginia